"Take a Back Road" is a song written by Rhett Akins and Luke Laird and recorded by American country music singer Rodney Atkins.  It was released in April 2011 as the first single and title track from Atkin's album of the same name. The song reached number one the US Billboard Hot Country Songs chart in October 2011.

Background and writing
Co-writer Rhett Akins came up with the song's title after hearing a friend say that listening to a Hank Williams Jr. album made him "want to ride a dirt road right now." Laird came up with a drum loop to which he could not think of any lyrics, and Akins recommended the hook. The two of them changed the line to "take a back road" and decided to give it a rhythmic phrasing.

Content
The song is about a man who is stuck in a traffic jam on a freeway. He then hears a George Strait song from 1982 and it makes him want to drive down a country road.

Critical reception
Giving it four stars out of five, Matt Bjorke of Roughstock called it "the perfect song to listen to when feeling like ‘escaping’ the pressures of the world for a few minutes". Kevin John Coyne, reviewing the song for Country Universe, gave it a C+ rating. Coyne states that everyone already knew what the song was going to be about and that he gave it a "bonus + for rhyming gravel with travel." Steve Leggett of Allmusic called it "one of the summer’s most memorable singles (complete with a George Strait name check)."

Music video
The music video was directed by Andy Tennant and premiered in September 2011. It was filmed on Interstate 65 near Nashville, Tennessee and in Carthage, Tennessee.

Chart performance

Weekly charts

Year-end charts

Decade-end charts

Certifications

References

Songs about roads
2011 singles
2011 songs
Rodney Atkins songs
Songs written by Rhett Akins
Songs written by Luke Laird
Curb Records singles